Yúcahu —also written as Yucáhuguama Bagua Maórocoti, Yukajú, Yocajú, Yokahu or Yukiyú— was the masculine spirit of fertility in Taíno mythology. He was the supreme deity or zemi of the Pre-Columbian Taíno people along with his mother Atabey who was his feminine counterpart. Dominant in the Caribbean region at the time of Columbus’ First voyages of Discovery, the peoples associated with Taíno culture inhabited the islands of the Bahamas, the Greater Antilles, and the Lesser Antilles.

Mythology
Yúcahu was the supreme deity of the Taíno people. "They call him Yúcahu Bagua Maórocoti" is the earliest mention of the zemí taken from the first page of Fray Ramón Pané's Account of the Antiquities of the Indians. As the Taíno did not possess a written language, the name is the phonetic spelling as recorded by the Spanish missionaries, Ramón Pané, and Bartolomé de las Casas. The three names are thought to represent the Great Spirit's epithets. Yúcahu means spirit or giver of cassava. Bagua has been interpreted as meaning both "the sea" itself and "master of the sea." The name Maórocoti implies that he was conceived without male intervention. He was also later known as "El Gigante Dormido", or "Sleeping Giant".  

The Taíno had a well developed creation myth, which was mostly passed down via oral tradition. According to this account, in the beginning there was only Atabey, who created the heavens. However, there was still a void, where nothingness prevailed. The heavens were inactive and any action was meaningless. Earth and the other cosmic entities laid barren. Despite being dominated by darkness, Atabey herself failed to notice that this universe was incomplete. Eventually she decided to create two new deities, Yucáhu and Guacar, from magic and intangible elements. Atabey now felt confident that her creation could be completed and left it in charge of her sons. Yucáhu took over as a creation deity, becoming a universal architect and gathering the favour of his mother. From his dwelling in the heavens, he contemplated and awoke the Earth from its slumber. As part of this process, two new deities emerged from a cave. Boinael and Maroya, controlling the sun and moon respectively, which were tasked with illuminating the new world day and night. No longer would the Earth be shrouded by darkness. Yucáhu was satisfied with his work, but in a fit of jealousy Guacar hid within the heavens, never to be seen again. Now bored, Yucáhu roamed and noticed four gemstones that lied in the ground, which he took and converted into the celestial star beings, who reproduced and spread throughout the universe, where they guide the deities. He followed this by creating animals, granting them dwellings and teaching them how to live. Yucáhu then had a revelation, believing that something else should complete his creation. Convinced that the new entity should be neither animal nor deity, he pondered this profoundly. Yucáhu then opened a rift in the heavens from which emerged the first man, whom he granted a soul and named Locuo. This man would roam the Earth endlessly filled by joy and thanking the deity for his creation. Finally satisfied with his creation, Yucáhu left the world in the hands of humanity, feeling that balance had been reached.

Yúcahu became known as the deity of agriculture, as well as the zemi of peace and tranquility, he represented goodness. This was contrasted greatly by the goddess Guabancex (more commonly, but erroneously, known as Juracán) whose fierce nature was regarded as responsible for persuading other zemis in order to bring forth chaos and who was associated with the more aggressive Caribs. Yúcahu was believed to have a throne in El Yunque peak, the largest mountain found in the tropical El Yunque National Forest reserve, where he resided in the same manner that the Greek gods did in Mount Olympus. The Taíno referred to the peak as yuké, or "The White Lands", in reference to the thick cloud shroud that always surrounds it. This mountain range diverts the wind of hurricanes, minimizing the damage that the storms do to the lower parts of the island. Noticing this, the natives interpreted this as Yúcahu confronting Guabancex and her cohorts over the safety of his worshipers.  Located in the northern mountains of Puerto Rico, the region where El Yunke is located was originally known as "Yukiyu", a name that became associated with the deity. Following the Spanish colonization, it became known under the Hispanized variant of Luquillo, a name that remains in use.

Modern usage

Religious
Adaptations of traditional Taíno religion are practiced by a number of neo-Taíno groups, featuring Yúcahu as part of their pantheons.

Cultural
As with other mythologies, Taíno religion and the good/evil (in this case Yúcahu/Juracán) dichotomy has been adapted for comic books, in particular being central as the source of supernatural superpowers in Edgardo Miranda Rodríguez's La Borinqueña.

Preceding the impending passing of hurricanes Irma and Maria over Puerto Rico during the 2017 Atlantic hurricane season, artistic representations depicting an updated model of Yúcahu (as the sentient embodiment of El Yunque, distinguished by a humanoid form composed by the forest's vegetation) became widespread in social media as a method to boost the population's morale.

References

Bibliography 

 
 
 
 

Gods of the indigenous peoples of North America
Taíno mythology
Fertility gods
Creator gods
Sky and weather gods
Sea and river gods
Peace gods
Agricultural gods